Nikoloz Mnatobishvili (born 27 September 1992) is a Georgian footballer.

References

External links
 
 Profile at Pressball.by

1993 births
Living people
Footballers from Georgia (country)
Expatriate footballers from Georgia (country)
Expatriate footballers in Belarus
FC Dila Gori players
FC Dnepr Mogilev players
FC Gagra players
FC Shevardeni-1906 Tbilisi players
Association football defenders